The 1917 Bath Riots occurred in January 1917 at the Santa Fe Bridge between El Paso, Texas and Juárez, Mexico. The riots are known to have been started by Carmelita Torres and lasted from January 28 to January 30 and were sparked by new immigration policies at the El Paso–Juárez Immigration and Naturalization Service office, requiring Mexicans crossing the border to take de-lousing baths and be vaccinated. Reports that nude photographs of women bathers and fear of potential fire from the kerosene baths, led Carmelita Torres to refuse to submit to the procedure. Denied a refund of her transport fare, she began yelling at the officials and convinced other riders to join her. After three days, the discontent subsided, but the disinfections of Mexicans at the U.S. border continued for forty years.

Background
By 1914, Venustiano Carranza had been sworn into office as Mexico's head of state ending the main fighting of the Mexican Revolution. U.S. President Woodrow Wilson, tired of the fighting and being more concerned with events unfolding in Europe and World War I, withdrew American forces from Mexico. Mexican revolutionary Pancho Villa refused to give up the fight and continued to execute border skirmishes. Between 1915 and 1917, typhus (which was sometimes reported as typhoid fever) spread from Mexico City to the provinces from Veracruz to Jalisco. In September 1916, Carranza called for a constitutional convention to end the conflict and bring peace to Mexico. The convention ended simultaneously with the end of the riots, on January 31, 1917, and subsequently the new constitution was signed on February 5.

During the same period, Thomas Calloway Lea Jr. was elected as the mayor of El Paso, Texas. Lea sent telegrams to U.S. Senators in Washington demanding a quarantine be put in place to stem the tide of "dirty lousey destitute Mexicans" who would spread typhus into El Paso. The Public Health Service Officer for El Paso, Dr. B. J. Lloyd, admitted there was little danger and opposed a quarantine, but suggested opening de-lousing plants. U.S. officials quickly adopted a policy of sanitizing Mexican immigrants at a disinfecting station in El Paso. The policy initially applied to all Mexicans entering the United States at El Paso, but soon spread to the Laredo–Nuevo Laredo crossing, and eventually along the entire U.S. Mexico border.

Men were separated from women and children into separate buildings, where they were stripped of all clothing and valuables. Most clothing and valuables were steamed. Other items which might be damaged by steam (like shoes, hats, or belts) were exposed to cyanogen gas. Attendants examined the nude people for lice. The officers conducting the strip searches were rumored to have photographed the nude women and shared the photos to others at bars. When lice were found on a man, the man's hair was clipped close to his head and the clippings were burned. For a woman, the hair was doused in a mixture of vinegar and kerosene, wrapped in a towel, and left on the hair for at least 30 minutes. If lice were found on re-inspection, the process was repeated. Once attendants declared the lice test had been "passed", the naked people were gathered in a bathing area and sprayed with a liquid soap made of soap chips and kerosene oil. After collecting their sanitized clothing and dressing, migrants were evaluated by a foreman, vaccinated and given a certificate that they had completed the procedure. From the disinfecting area, migrants then entered the Immigration and Naturalization Service building for processing.

Riot
Around 7:30 a.m. on January 28, 1917, the riot began when inspectors attempted to remove Mexican women from their trolley, which they were riding to work. Ordered to disembark and submit to the disinfection process, 17-year-old Carmelita Torres refused, having heard reports that nude women were being photographed while in the baths. Reports had also circulated that bathers might be set on fire, as had happened the previous year when gasoline baths at the El Paso City Jail had resulted in the death of 28 inmates when a cigarette ignited bathers. She requested permission to enter without submitting to bathing and was refused. She then demanded a refund of her fare and upon refusal of a refund convinced the other women on her cable car to protest. The women began shouting and hurling stones at health and immigration officials, sentries and civilians, who had gathered to watch the disturbance. The majority of the early protesters were young, domestic workers employed in homes in El Paso but as the crowd grew to several thousand a mixture of people became involved. Four trolleys which had made early morning runs to collect workers on the Juárez side were seized and did not return to the El Paso side until mid-afternoon.

Around 10 o'clock, General Andrés G. García drove to the center of the bridge to try to quiet the mob and was only partially successful, as the mob tried to prevent his car from leaving the Mexican side. By the afternoon, when it was clear that those who had entered the baths were not being harmed, the crowds were finally dispersed by mounted soldiers on each side of the border. One cable car motorman and a mail coach driver were reported to have been beaten by rioters and several media movie makers were attacked. Despite rumors that someone had been shot, Mexican authorities denied the event and reported that no serious injuries resulted.

On the 29th rioting continued, but this time, the majority of rioters were men. Newspapers reported that the men were taking advantage of the bath disturbance to protest the Carranza regime and voice support for his rival Pancho Villa. Juárez Police Chief Maximo Torres ordered all rioters arrested and the Mexican cavalry dispersed the rioters from the bridge. Business owners and households who were without laborers consulted with the Chamber of Commerce to resolve the issues promptly as most workers refused to come to work. Officials clarified that those who were not infected could be passed without having to bathe and that certificates were valid for a week.
 
By January 30, precautionary measures taken by authorities on both sides of the border had quelled the rioting. Two men and one woman were arrested at the American side of the bridge for assaulting a customs officer and an infantryman, but no further violence was reported. Policemen from Juárez monitored the southern end of the bridge crossing, a Mexican health inspector Andrés García was present to maintain respectful treatment at the disinfection plant, and street car service between the two cities was suspended. Notices had been posted in Juárez to advise that the inspectors in El Paso would accept health certificates issued by Mexican health inspectors.

Legacy
Though hailed by some as the "Latina Rosa Parks", Carmelita Torres was mostly forgotten, and her actions had little lasting effect. The Immigration Act of 1917 passed just days after the riot and imposed barriers for Mexican laborers entering the United States. For the first time in history, workers were required to pass literacy tests, pay a head tax and were forbidden to perform contract labor. Business owners in the Southwest pressed Congress to exempt Mexican workers from contract labor restrictions and head taxes. After the U.S. entered World War I, businessmen were able to lift the 1917 immigration terms for Mexican workers, and the exemption lasted until 1921. However, the bathing and fumigations, which later used insecticides and DDT, continued into the 1950s, and, in the 1920s, authorities at the Santa Fe Bridge fumigated the clothing of Mexicans crossing into the U.S. with Zyklon B, later used by the Nazis to exterminate prisoners in the concentration camps. A similar riot the following year was averted when prompt action by Mexican authorities intervened with American authorities. Reports of a typhus death in Juárez were denied by Mexicans, and the port and trolleys were temporarily closed to prevent altercations.

In 2006, David Dorado Romo published Ringside Seat to a Revolution which brought the story back to the attention of the public and Chicano scholars. National Public Radio featured a story on the riots in 2006.

References

Citations

Bibliography

 

  and  
 and 
 
 
 
 
  and

External links
 NPR video
"Carmelita" tribute song to Carmelita Torres (Bath Riots), written by Joe DeFilippo and performed by the R.J. Phillips Band

1917 in the United States
1917 labor disputes and strikes
1917 riots
Immigrant rights activism
January 1917 events
Labor disputes in Texas
Labour disputes in Mexico
Mexican-American riots in the United States
Women activists